Ashton is a surname.

Notable people with the surname "Ashton" include

A
Alan Ashton (disambiguation), multiple people
Al Hunter Ashton (1957–2007), English actor
Algernon Ashton (1859–1937), British composer
Andrew Ashton (born 1971), English book designer

B
Bill Ashton (disambiguation), multiple people
Brent Ashton (born 1960), Canadian ice hockey player
Brian Ashton (disambiguation), multiple people

C
Camille Levin Ashton (born 1990), American soccer player
Carter Ashton (born 1991), Canadian ice hockey player
Catherine Ashton (born 1956), British politician
Chad Ashton (born 1967), American soccer player
Charles Ashton (disambiguation), multiple people
Charlotte Ashton, British television presenter
Chris Ashton (born 1987), English rugby league footballer
Claude Ashton (1901–1942), English cricketer and footballer
Collin Ashton (born 1983), American football player
Cyril Ashton (born 1942), English Anglican bishop

D
Dan Ashton (born 1954), Canadian politician
David Ashton (disambiguation), multiple people
Dean Ashton (born 1983), English footballer
Derek Ashton (1922–1997), English footballer
Diana Ashton (born 1955), British swimmer
Donald M. Ashton (1919–2004), English art director
Dore Ashton (1928–2017), American art critic and writer

E
Edward Ashton (disambiguation), multiple people
Edwin Ashton (1893–1970), English footballer
Eliza Ashton (1851/1852–1900), English-Australian journalist and social reformer
Elizabeth Ashton (born 1950), Canadian equestrian
Ellis Ashton (1919–1985), English comedian
Eric Ashton (1935–2008), English rugby league footballer
Ernest Charles Ashton (1873–1957), Canadian soldier
Ernie Ashton (1883–1955), Australian rules footballer
Ethel V. Ashton (1896–1975), American artist

F
Ferris Ashton (1926–2013), Australian rugby league footballer
Francis Leslie Ashton (1904–1994), English writer
Fred Ashton (1931–2013), American politician
Frederick Ashton (1904–1988), English dancer and choreographer

G
Gilbert Ashton (1896–1981), English cricketer
Graham Ashton (born 1962), Australian police officer
Graham Ashton (trumpeter), British-American musician
Gwyn Ashton (born 1960), Welsh-Australian guitarist

H
Heather Ashton (1929–2019), British psychopharmacologist
Kevin Ashton (born 1968), British technology pioneer
Helen Ashton (1891–1958), British novelist
Henry Ashton (disambiguation), multiple people
Herbert Ashton (1885–1927), English footballer
Hubert Ashton (1898–1979), English cricketer
Hugh Ashton (died 1522), English churchman
Hugh C. S. Ashton, British polo player

J
Jack Ashton, British actor
James Ashton (disambiguation), multiple people
Jayne Ashton (born 1957), English squash player
Jennifer Ashton (born 1969), American physician
Jim Ashton (1891–1961), Australian rules footballer
Joey Matenga Ashton (1907–1993), New Zealand railway worker
John Ashton (disambiguation), multiple people
Jon Ashton (born 1982), English footballer
Joseph Ashton (disambiguation), multiple people
Josh Ashton (1949–1993), American football player
Juli Ashton (born 1969), American pornographic actress
Julian Ashton (1851–1942), English-Australian artist
Julian Howard Ashton (1877–1964) English-Australian journalist

K
Kalinda Ashton, Australian writer
Ken Ashton (1925–2002), British journalist and trade union leader
Kimberley Ashton (born 1987), Jèrriais cyclist and badminton player

L
Laura Ashton, Canadian businesswoman
Leah Ashton, Australian novelist
Leigh Ashton (born 1956), English-South African musician
Leigh Ashton (museum director) (1897–1983), British art historian
Leonard Ashton (1915–2001), English bishop
Leslie Ashton (1986–2012), American singer
Lisa Ashton (born 1970), English darts player
Lorin Ashton (born 1978), American musician
Lyn Ashton (born 1951), American canoeist

M
Malcolm Ashton, English statistician
Marcia Ashton (born 1932), British actress
Margaret Ashton (1856–1937), English politician
Mark Ashton (1960–1987), British activist
Mark Ashton (musician) (born 1949), British musician
Martyn Ashton (born 1974), British biker
Marvin Ashton (disambiguation), multiple people
Matthew Ashton (born 1988), American poker player
Matty Ashton (born 1998), English rugby league footballer
Michael Ashton (born 1982), New Zealand makeup artist

N
Nathan Ashton (born 1987), English footballer
Neil Ashton (born 1985), English footballer and football manager
N. H. Ashton (1913–2000), British ophthalmologist
Nicholas Ashton (1904–1986), English cricketer
Nigel J. Ashton, English history professor
Niki Ashton (born 1982), Canadian politician

P
Pat Ashton (1931–2013), English actress
Percy Ashton (1895–1934), English cricketer
Percy Ashton (footballer) (1909–1985), English footballer
Peter Ashton (disambiguation), multiple people
Philip Ashton (1702–1746), English castaway
Philip Ashton (cricketer) (born 1988), English cricketer

Q
Queenie Ashton (1903–1999), English actress

R
Ray Ashton (born 1960), English rugby league footballer
Raymond J. Ashton (1887–1973), American architect
Richard Ashton (born 1963), English cricketer
Robert Ashton (disambiguation), multiple people
Robin Ashton, American civil servant
Ron Ashton (born 1954), Canadian ice hockey player
Roger Ashton (??–1592), English soldier
Rosemary Ashton (born 1947), Scottish literary scholar
Roy Ashton (1909–1995), Australian musician
Ruth Ashton Taylor (born 1922), American newscaster
Ryan Ashton (born 1984), American actor

S
Sam Ashton (born 1986), English footballer
Steve Ashton (born 1956), Canadian politician
Susan Ashton (born 1967), American musician
Sylvia Ashton (1880–1940), American actress

T
Teddy Ashton (1906–1978), English footballer
Tom Ashton, British musician
Tony Ashton (1946–2001), English musician
Tracy Ashton, American actress
T. S. Ashton (1889–1968), English historian

W
Wendell J. Ashton (1912–1995), American publisher
Will Ashton (1881–1963), British-Australian artist and art director
William Ashton (disambiguation), multiple people
W. P. B. Ashton (1897–1981), British army officer

Z
Zach Ashton, American musician
Zawe Ashton (born 1984), British actress

See Also
Ashton (given name), a page for people with the given name "Ashton"
Ashton (disambiguation), a disambiguation page for "Ashton"

English-language surnames